Invincible Summer is the fifth solo album by k.d. lang, released by Warner Bros. Records in 2000.  The album's title derives from a quote by Albert Camus: "In the depths of winter, I finally learned that within me there lay an invincible summer."

Critical Reception 
In an Allmusic review, Stacia Proefrock wrote "Glowing with happiness and lovey bliss, this lush album is dripping with the kind of bright, slick production that hasn't seen much light since the Brill Building's heyday. Swelling strings, electronic bubbles and warbles, and the occasional mandolin combine to create a sound that manages to evoke a warm feeling of nostalgia without sounding retro. Topping it all off is lang's smooth-as-maple-syrup voice, which shows even greater range than before."

In a three-and-a-half star Rolling Stone review, James Hunter wrote "On 'Invincible Summer,' k.d. lang reorchestrates the relaxed loveliness of Sixties Southern California pop and, to a lesser extent, Brazilian music...The music is often quick-paced fluff with the retro exactness, and the soul, of a Pottery Barn sofa. But for the most part, lang's lighter musical tack encourages her to retire the galloping self-regard that can cancel the attractiveness of her voice."

Track listing

Personnel
k.d. lang - vocals
Rusty Anderson - guitar
Wendy Melvoin - guitar
Smokey Hormel - guitar
Jon Stewart - guitar
Rick Baptist - trumpet
Teddy Borowiecki - accordion, keyboard
Denyse Buffum - viola
Larry Corbett - cello
Mario de Leon - violin
Joel Derouin - violin
John Friesen - cello
John Fumo - trumpet
Armen Garabedian - violin
Berj Garabedian - violin
Jon Hassell - trumpet
Suzie Katayama - cello
Peter Kent - violin
Abe Laboriel Jr. - drums, vocals
Abraham Laboriel - bass, guitar, vocals
Damian LeGassick - guitar, keyboard
Greg Leisz - pedal steel
Gayle Levant - harp
Jon Lewis - trumpet
Ben Mink - violin, keyboard, viola
Vicki Miskolczy - viola
Bob Peterson - violin
David Piltch - bass, guitar, mandolin, cornet, keyboard, human whistle, loop, Moog bass, baritone guitar
Daniel Smith - cello
David Stenske - viola
John Wittenberg - violin

Production
Producers: David Kahne, Damian LeGassick
Engineers: Jason Mauza, John Smith
Assistant engineers: Andy Ackland, Tony Flores, James Stone
Mixing: Rob Brill, David Kahne, Johnny "Hammond" Smith
Mastering: Bob Ludwig
Digital editing: Eric White
Drum programming: Eric White
Brass arrangement: Damian LeGassick
String arrangements: Damian LeGassick, Ben Mink
Vocal arrangement: Alex Gifford
Art direction: Jeri Heiden, John Heiden
Design: Jeri Heiden, John Heiden
Photography: Just Loomis

Charts

Weekly charts

Certifications

A^ In the United States, Invincible Summer also entered the Top Internet Albums chart, peaking at #9 there.

References

External links
 

K.d. lang albums
2000 albums
Albums produced by David Kahne
Warner Records albums